Antanambao Andranolava is a rural municipality in Madagascar. It belongs to the district of Marovoay, which is a part of Boeny Region. The population of the commune was estimated to be approximately 5,000 in 2001 commune census.

Only primary schooling is available. The majority 80% of the population of the commune are farmers, while an additional 8% receives their livelihood from raising livestock. The most important crop is rice, while other important products are maize and cassava.  Services provide employment for 10% of the population. Additionally fishing employs 2% of the population.

Roads
It is crossed by the National Road 4

See also
Berivotra Formation

References and notes 

Populated places in Boeny